Prabha is an Indian actress and Kuchipudi dancer from Andhra Pradesh. She has acted about 125 films in Telugu, Tamil, Malayalam and Kannada alongside popular Tollywood actors such as N. T. Rama Rao and Akkineni Nageswara Rao.She won two Nandi Awards.

Career

Dancer
She learnt Kuchipudi dance as a child, but took it up full-time when she found the right guru. Her dance debut and marriage both happened at the same time. She gave 40 performances in the USA.

Accident 
When she was in a film shoot she met with an accident where the car was tilted over and boiling water from the radiator spilled onto her legs. She suffered from those burns for nearly two months. She has mentioned this in a Telugu television Talk show called Alitho Saradaga  which telecasts on ETV.

Filmography

Telugu

 Needa Leni Aadathe (1974) - Debut in Telugu
 Bhoomi Kosam (1974)
 Ammayilu Jagratha (1975)
 Annadammula Katha (1975)
 Ramayya Thandri (1975)
 Athavarillu (1976)
 Mahakavi Kshetrayya (1976) as Rukmini
 Vintha Illu Santha Gola (1976)
 Manchiki Maro Peru (1976) as Chandrika
 Daana Veera Soora Karna (1977)
 Devathalara Deevinchandi (1977) as Savitri
 Aame Katha (1977)
 Jaganmohini (1978)
 Dongala Dopidi (1978)
 Manchi Manasu (1978)
 Intinti Ramayanam (1979)
 Maa Voori Devatha (1979)
 Korikale Gurralaite (1979)
 Gandharva Kanya (1979)
 Samsara Bandam (1980)
 Shri Vinayaka Vijayamu (1980) as Priyamvada 
 Sandhya Raagam (1981)
 Parvati Parameshwarulu (1981) as Sunitha
 Nenu Maa Aavida (1981)
 Santoshi Mata Vrata Mahatyam (1983)
 Simham Navvindi (1983) as Swapna
 Padmavyuham (1984)
 Rojulu Marayi (1984)
 Manishiko Charithra (1984)
 Shri Datta Darshanam (1985) as Sumathi
 Bhale Thammudu (1985)
 Tandra Paparayudu (film) (1986)
 Aatma Bandhuvulu (1987)
 Mugguru Kodukulu (1988)
 Brahma Puthrudu (1988)
 Maya Bazaar (1995)
 Kondapalli Rathaiah (1995)
 Chala Bagundi (2001)
 Raghavendra (film) (2003) as Raghava's mother
 Kabirdas (2003)
 Vegu chukkalu (2004)
 Lakshmi Kalyanam (2007)
 Kick (2009)
 Nagavalli (2010) as Parvathi Devi
 Uu Kodathara? Ulikki Padathara? (2012) as Rishi Kumar's mother
 Rebel (2012)
 James Bond (2015) as Vasundara
 Rudhramadevi (2015)
 Bengal Tiger (2015)
 NTR:Kathanayakudu (2018)
 Kakatheeyudu (2019) 
 Prati Roju Pandage (2019)

Tamil
 Thunive Thunai (1976) as Prabha (debut in Tamil as Jayaprabha)
 Penn Jenmam (1977)
 Jaganmohini (1978)
 Tripura Sundari (1978)
 Gandharva Kanni (1979)
 Nee Sirithal Naan Sirippen (1979)
 Natchathiram (1980)
 Mayavi (1985)
 Aayiram Kannudayaal (1986)
 Naadodigal (2009) as Sangvi Pathak
 Avan Ivan (2011) as Kumbudren Saamy's mother
 Kutti Puli (2013)

Malayalam
 Rowdy Rajamma (1977)
 Madhuraswapnam (1977)
 Hridhayathinte Nirangal (1979)
 Pennorumbettaal (1979)
 Thirayum Theeravum (1980) as Usha
 Manushya Mrugam (1980)
 Hamsa Geetham (1981)
 Maattuvin Chattangale (1982) as Rajani
 Alakadalinakkare (1984) as Amina
 Oru Naal Innoru Naal (1985)
 Agniyaanu Njaan Agni (1986)

Kannada
 Manege Banda Mahalakshmi (1983)
 Nammoora Basvi (1983)
 Gandugali Rama (1983)

TV Series
 Anandham (2007-2009, Tamil) as Charulatha/Muthulakshmi
Kalasi Unte Kaladu Sukham (2021-present, Telugu) as Geetha

Awards
Nandi Awards
Best Supporting Actress - Dharma Vaddi (1981)
Special Jury Award - Vegu Chukkalu (2003)

References

External links

Telugu actresses
Tamil actresses
Actresses in Kannada cinema
Actresses in Malayalam cinema
Actresses in Tamil cinema
Actresses in Telugu cinema
Actresses in Tamil television
Actresses from Andhra Pradesh
Kuchipudi exponents
People from Guntur district
20th-century Indian actresses
21st-century Indian actresses